Allium oliganthum is a plant species in the Amaryllis family found from Siberia to North-West China. It is also known as the Kazakh leek, and it is grown as an ornamental plant.

References

oliganthum